Albert Joseph Brown III (born June 4, 1968), known professionally as Al B. Sure!, is an American singer, songwriter, record producer, radio host and former record executive. He was born in Boston and raised in Mount Vernon, New York. During the late 1980s and early 1990s, Brown was one of new jack swing's most popular romantic singers, songwriters and record producers.

Early life and music career
Brown is the son of Albert Joseph Brown II, a nuclear medical technician, and Cassandra Brown, an accountant. Brown was a star football quarterback at Mount Vernon High School in New York, who rejected an athletic scholarship to the University of Iowa to pursue a music career. In 1987, Quincy Jones selected Brown as the first winner of the Sony Innovators Talent Search. He went on to work with Jones on several projects, most notably the platinum 1990 single "The Secret Garden (Sweet Seduction Suite)" from Jones' double-platinum-certified album Back on the Block. On this recording, Brown was one of a quartet with Barry White, El DeBarge, and James Ingram.

Brown's 1988 debut album In Effect Mode sold more than three million copies, topping the Billboard R&B chart for seven straight weeks. It included the single "Nite and Day," which topped the R&B chart and reached No. 7 on the Billboard Hot 100, and "Off on Your Own (Girl)", which also top the R&B chart. He received numerous Grammy and American Music Award (AMA) nominations, and won an AMA for Best New R&B Artist. He also received several Soul Train Award nominations, and won the award for Best New Artist. Brown also won several New York Music Awards. In addition, his 1–900 phone line was third in generating revenue, following those for New Kids on the Block and Run-D.M.C.

As a writer and producer, Brown introduced to the music industry such multi-platinum acts as Jodeci and teen R&B performer Tevin Campbell (who was also one of Prince's and Quincy Jones' former protégés), as well as Faith Evans, Dave Hollister, Case and Usher.

In 2009, Brown signed with Hidden Beach Recordings. His first single for the label, "I Love It (Papi Aye, Aye, Aye)," entered the Radio & Records Urban AC chart at No. 33. The album Honey, I'm Home was released on June 23, 2009.

Other work
In 1991, Brown co-starred with Martin Lawrence in a television pilot titled Private Times.

In 1993, Brown provided vocals to the title track of the David Bowie album Black Tie White Noise. He performed the song live with Bowie on The Tonight Show the same year.

In 2000, Brown's ABS Entertainment launched a television development division, and he served as co-executive producer of an HBO Comedy Special starring Jamie Foxx, filmed at the Paramount Theater in Oakland, California. Then, Brown teamed with the ABC Radio Network to produce and host a romantically themed nighttime music program, The Secret Garden, featuring a blend of music and celebrity guests.

Brown participated in Bless the Children Foundation's celebrity auction along with NFL stars Charles Woodson and Anthony Dorsett. He was presented with the key to the city of Oakland by city council member Laurence E. Reid in recognition of the participation of Brown's ABS Ken-Struk-Shen in refurbishing parts of the city. Reid proclaimed October 19 Al B. Sure! Day. Brown was a DJ on the Los Angeles radio station KHHT, and played old-school hip hop and R&B. He currently hosts a daily morning-radio show on iHeart Radio.

In July 2019, Brown became the new host of Urban One's nationally syndicated evening quiet storm/slow jams program Love and R&B, replacing the previous host, John Monds. The show, syndicated through Urban One subsidiary Reach Media and based in Dallas, Texas, is heard on urban adult contemporary format radio stations such as WZAK in Cleveland, WMMJ in Washington, KZMJ in Dallas, and WDMK in Detroit among others.

In 2010, Brown appeared as one of the 12 contestants on the TV One reality television dating game show The Ultimate Merger. The series was produced by Donald Trump and starred former Apprentice contestant Omarosa Manigault-Stallworth, whom Brown dated previously.

Personal life
Al B. Sure! has three sons. His eldest son Albert Joseph Brown IV, also known as Al B Sure Jr, was featured on the MTV series Rock the Cradle. His second son Devin Brown is a hip hop singer and goes by the name of Devin LOUD. In 1991 he had a son, Quincy Brown by Kim Porter. Quincy was named after the musician who mentored Al B. Sure! Quincy Jones. In that same year, he co-wrote a song called "Forever My Lady" in honor of Kim and his son. The song was performed by Jodeci and produced by Al B. Sure! and Jodeci-member DeVante Swing.

Discography

Studio albums

Compilation albums

Singles

Featured singles

Writing & Producing Credits

References

External links

 

1968 births
Living people
American actors
Warner Records artists
African-American radio personalities
African-American record producers
African-American songwriters
American radio personalities
American rhythm and blues keyboardists
American rhythm and blues singer-songwriters
Record producers from Massachusetts
American soul singers
New jack swing musicians
Participants in American reality television series
Musicians from Boston
People from Leonia, New Jersey
Singer-songwriters from New Jersey
American contemporary R&B singers
21st-century African-American people
20th-century African-American people
American male singer-songwriters
Singer-songwriters from Massachusetts
Mount Vernon High School (New York) alumni